George John Stevenson (1818–1888) was an English bookseller, headmaster, author and hymnologist.

Life
Born in Chesterfield on 7 July 1818, he was the son of John George Stevenson (1792–1866) of Chesterfield, by his wife Jane, daughter of John Aldred. He was educated at Duttoris grammar school, Chesterfield, and from an early age until 1844 he was employed in the printing and bookselling business.

In 1844 Stevenson entered St. John's College, Battersea, to be trained for an organising mastership under the National Society. In 1846 a reformatory school was established in the Philanthropic Institute, Southwark, to take selected criminals from prisons, and Stevenson was appointed its first headmaster. In 1848 he became headmaster of the endowed parochial school at Lambeth Green.

Stevenson resigned his post in 1855, and established himself in Paternoster Row as a bookseller and publisher, a business which he continued until a few years before his death. From 1861 to 1867 he was editor and proprietor of the Wesleyan Times, and in 1882 he edited the Union Review. He died on 16 August 1888.

Works
A Methodist from 1831, Stevenson wrote on the denomination's history and literature. His Methodist Hymn Book and its Associations (1869) was published in enlarged form as The Methodist Hymn Book, illustrated with Biography, Incident, and Anecdote (1883). He wrote also:

 The Origin of Alphabetical Characters, London, 1853.
 Sketch of the Life of C. H. Spurgeon, London, 1857; new edition 1887. 
 The American Evangelist, London, 1860.
 The Prince of Preachers, C. H. Spurgeon, London. 
 City Road Chapel, London, and its Associations, Edinburgh, 1872.
 Memorials of the Wesley Family, London, 1876; new edition 1883. 
 Sir Charles Reed: a Life Sketch, London, 1884.
 Historical Records of the Young Men's Christian Association, London, 1884.
 Methodist Worthies, London, 1884.
 Memorial Sketch of May Stevenson, London, 1886.

Stevenson also edited A Historical Sketch of the Christian Community, 1818–1826 (1868) and Samuel Wesley's Memorials of Elizabeth Ann Wesley, London, 1887.

Notes

 
Attribution
 

1818 births
1888 deaths
English booksellers
Schoolteachers from Derbyshire
English writers
Heads of schools in England
19th-century English businesspeople